Five ships of the French Navy have borne the name Africain ("African"):

List
  (1701), a 44-gun ship of the line, hulked in Rochefort in 1723.
  (1769), a 26-gun flûte, broken up in 1780.
  (1795), a 1-gun flûte, of uncertain origin in service May to September 1795 at Pasjes 
  (1819), a paddle-wheel steam aviso, decommissioned in Saint Louis, Senegal, in 1827. 
  (1832), a paddle-wheel steam aviso, decommissioned in Saint Louis, Senegal, in 1838. 
  (1858), a paddle-wheel steam aviso, broken up in 1878.
  (1858), named Africain 1879–1881, last mentioned 1882.

See also

Notes, citations, and references

Notes

Citations

References 
 
Winfield, Rif & Stephen S Roberts (2015) French Warships in the Age of Sail 1786 – 1861: Design Construction, Careers and Fates. (Seaforth Publishing). 

French Navy ship names